Mississippi Highway 328 (MS 328) is an east-west state highway located entirely in the Yocona River valley of the North Central Hills in northern Mississippi, connecting MS 315 to Markette at MS 7. 

The entire highway is located in Lafayette County. The state highway serves the town of Taylor (via MS 733, a.k.a. Main Street).

Route description

MS 328 begins a few miles northwest of Water Valley at an intersection with MS 315 at the eastern end of Enid Lake.  It winds its way northeast through hilly woodlands for a couple miles before traveling due east as it enters the Yocona River Valley. The highway travels along the northern banks of the river as it passes through farmland for several miles, where it makes a sharp left turn at an intersection with Marshall County Road 387 (CR 387, provides direct access to the town of Water Valley). MS 328 now also becomes known as Cotton Road as it travels along the southern edge of the town of Taylor, with access to the town provided via MS 733 (Main Street) and Cutoff Road. MS 328 comes to an end shortly thereafter at an intersection with MS 7 just a couple miles south of Oxford, directly across the river from that highway's intersection with MS 9W.

The entire length of Mississippi Highway 328 is a rural, two-lane, state highway.

Major intersections

References

External links

328
Transportation in Lafayette County, Mississippi